Aurbach is a surname. Notable people with the surname include:

Arnold Aurbach (1888–1952), Polish-French chess player
Gerald D. Aurbach (1927–1991), American medical scientist
Doron Aurbach (born 1952), Israeli electrochemist, materials and surface scientist

See also 
 Auerbach (disambiguation)